Rye Meeting House, also known as Milton Mission Chapel, Grace Chapel, and the Friends Meeting House, is a historic Quaker meeting house located at Rye, Westchester County, New York. The property is adjacent to the Bird Homestead.  It is a one-story, wood-frame building on a stone foundation with two main volumes, a nave and an asymmetrical transept. The exterior is sheathed in clapboard and shingles and exhibits characteristics of the Stick style. The front facade features a -story bell tower.  The building was built in the 1830s as a school house.  It was moved to its present site in 1867, and enlarged in 1871, 1875, and 1877.  At the time, the church was a mission church of nearby Christ's Church, an Episcopal church. The Quakers obtained the property in 1959.  The property was deeded to the city of Rye in 2002.

It was added to the National Register of Historic Places in 2011. In 2015, The Preservation League of New York State selected the historic restoration work completed on Rye Meeting House to receive an Excellence in Historic Preservation award.

See also
National Register of Historic Places listings in southern Westchester County, New York

References

External links

Rye Patch blog: What Should the City Do with the Friends Meeting House?
Clemco Construction: 2015 Historic Restoration of Rye Meeting House

Quaker meeting houses in New York (state)
Churches on the National Register of Historic Places in New York (state)
Churches completed in 1877
Victorian architecture in New York (state)
Churches in Westchester County, New York
Buildings and structures in Rye, New York
National Register of Historic Places in Westchester County, New York